Imara analibiae is a moth in the Castniidae family. It is found in the forest of the Estación Biológica La Selva, near Puerto Viejo, Sarapiquí, Heredia Province in Costa Rica. The habitat consists of a mosaic of mature lowland forest, secondary growth forest of various ages and abandoned pastures.

The length of the forewings is about 45 mm for males and 59 mm for females.

Etymology
The specific epithet is a combination of the names Ana and Libia, the mothers of the two authors.

References

 , 2005: Description of a new species of Imara Houlbert, 1918 (Lepidoptera: Castniidae), Zootaxa 849: 1–8

Moths described in 2005
Castniidae